The Catalan Wikipedia is the Catalan-language edition of the Wikipedia free online encyclopedia. It was created on March 16, 2001, just a few minutes after the first non-English Wikipedia, the German edition. With more than  articles, it is currently the -largest Wikipedia as measured by the number of articles, and the fifth-largest Wikipedia in a Romance language. In April 2016, the project had 582 active editors who made at least five edits in that month. The edition is most notable for its large number of quality articles, which illustrates the Catalan language's important online presence despite being a minority language.

Creation
On March 16, 2001, Jimmy Wales announced that he wanted to create Wikipedias in other languages and mentioned that there was interest in creating a Catalan version. The first tests were made on the deutsche.wikipedia.com, and a few minutes later, the Catalan Wikipedia was created in the catalan.wikipedia.com domain.

The first edit on a non-English Wikipedia was at 21:07 UTC, March 16, 2001, made to the Catalan main page. The first contribution in a non-English article dates from March 17 at 01:41 UTC in the article Àbac. Despite being created after the German Wikipedia, for about two months it was the only non-English Wikipedia that contained articles.

After some time, the domain changed to ca.wikipedia.com and later to ca.wikipedia.org. About 2003 its community started to use the name "Viquipèdia" when talking about this edition of Wikipedia. Nowadays, this word is used in Catalan language to refer to the whole Wikipedia. About 2005, the domain www.viquipedia.net was registered and it redirects to ca.wikipedia.org. In 2007, www.viquipedia.cat was also registered and redirected.

The first registered user was probably AstroNomer, presumably used only to make some registration tests, but the first registered user to make lasting contributions was Cdani, the same user cited in Jimbo Wales' message.

In 2005 the Catalan Wikipedia community debated on which name(s) of the Catalan language to present in the main page and other policy pages, either català, "Catalan", valencià, "Valencian", or a combination of both català-valencià and català o valencià. Although there was not a consensus on any of the proposals, users agreed that in articles relevant to the Valencian Community, the name "Valencian" was to be used; on all other articles "Catalan" is preferred. The main page avoids making reference to a particular nomenclature, by simply stating aquesta versió, "this version".

Milestones and historical main pages

See also
 Spanish Wikipedia

Notes

References

External links

 Catalan Wikipedia mobile version 
 Internet Archive – Catalan Wikipedia main page, March 27, 2001 
 
 
 List of Wikipedias by sample of articles
Official Twitter account of Catalan Wikipedia
Official Instagram account of Catalan Wikipedia

Catalan-language encyclopedias
Wikipedias by language
Internet properties established in 2001
Catalan-language websites
2001 establishments in Catalonia
Wikipedias in Romance languages